Alessandro Papatodoro (1560–1597) was a Roman Catholic prelate who served as Bishop of Belcastro (1596–1597).

Biography
Alessandro Papatodoro was born in Terra Francavilla in 1560 and ordained a priest in 1589. On 12 August 1596, he was appointed during the papacy of Pope Paul III as Bishop of Belcastro. He served as Bishop of Belcastro until his death in 1597.

References

External links and additional sources
 (for Chronology of Bishops) 
 (for Chronology of Bishops) 

16th-century Italian Roman Catholic bishops
Bishops appointed by Pope Paul III
1560 births
1597 deaths
People from the Province of Brindisi